Old New Borrowed Blue is the nineteenth studio album by folk rock band Fairport Convention, although for this release, they were billed as "Fairport Acoustic Convention" as it was the band's first all-acoustic album in 29 years. Part studio, part live, it was recorded to publicise a tour of the United States and consisted of cover versions, new songs and classic tracks dating back to the band's early career. Dave Mattacks, who had provided drums and electronic instrumentation for previous albums, was absent.

Allmusic praised the album, saying "The playing is exquisite and the vocalizing by Simon Nicol and Dave Pegg is extraordinary".

Track listing
Studio tracks
 "Woodworm Swing"  (Ric Sanders) - 3:08
 "Men" (Loudon Wainwright III) - 3:45
 "Aunt Sally Shuffle" (Dave Pegg) - 1:22
 "There Once Was Love" (Paul Metsers) / Innstück (Maartin Allcock) - 4:45
 "Frozen Man" (James Taylor) - 4:20
 "Mr Sands Is in the Building" (Maartin Allcock) - 2:06
 "Lalla Rookh" (Words: Chris Leslie; Music: Maartin Allcock) - 4:27
Live tracks
 "Foolish You" (Wade Hemsworth) - 3:34
 "Crazy Man Michael" (Richard Thompson, Dave Swarbrick) - 5:09
 "The Widow of Westmorland's Daughter" (Traditional; arrangement by Fairport Convention) - 4:05
 "Genesis Hall" (Richard Thompson) - 4:13
 "The Deserter" (John Richards) - 5:43
 "The Swimming Song" (Loudon Wainwright III) - 3:24
 "Struck It Right" (Huw Williams) - 4:26
 "The Hiring Fair" (Ralph McTell, Dave Mattacks) - 6:07
 "Matty Groves"/"Dirty Linen" (Traditional; arranged by Fairport Convention) - 10:06

Personnel
Fairport Convention
 Simon Nicol - vocals, acoustic guitar
 Ric Sanders - violin
 Dave Pegg - acoustic bass guitar, mandolin, backing vocals
 Maartin Allcock - acoustic guitars, bouzar, accordion, mandocello, bodhran, backing vocals

Additional personnel
Mark Tucker - recording engineer (live) and CD mix.
Mat Davies - recording engineer (studio)

Release history
 1996, May : Woodworm Records WRCD 024, UK & Australia LP
 1996, June  : Green Linnet 3114, US CD
 1999, August : SSE Communications SSE-7301, Japan CD
 2007 : Talking Elephant 110, US CD

References

External links

Fairport Convention albums
1996 albums